The Reverend Ronald Lancaster  (born 1931) is an English Anglican clergyman, chemist, businessman and retired teacher, having taught chemistry at Kimbolton School from 1963 to 1988. He is a fireworks manufacturer, having founded and remained owner of Kimbolton Fireworks, the last manufacturer of fireworks in the UK before their closure in February 2019.

Biography
Lancaster was born and grew up in Huddersfield, West Yorkshire, where Standard Fireworks and Lion Fireworks were based. He became interested in fireworks after the coronation of George VI in 1937. He attended King James's School in Almondbury from 1942 to 1950, and then studied psychology at St John's College, Durham University from 1950. After national service, he studied theology at Cuddesdon in Oxfordshire, and became a curate in Morley, near Leeds.

He took up the post of chaplain and chemistry teacher at Kimbolton School in 1963. Later that year, he began producing fireworks at a workshop on the school grounds; the following year, with several other members of staff, he set up Kimbolton Fireworks to make pyrotechnics for public displays. The public displays put on by Kimbolton Fireworks include the 25th anniversary of the Queen's coronation in 1978, the 50th anniversary of VJ Day in 1995, the Hong Kong handover in 1997, and at the opening and closing ceremonies of the 2012 Summer Olympics in London.

With Takeo Shimizu, he published Fireworks: Principles and Practice in 1972; the fourth edition, described as the "bible of fireworks", was published in 2005.

Lancaster retired from teaching in 1988. He was given a plaque at the Pyrotechnics Guild International conference in 1984, dedicated to the "Master Blaster Pastor". He became a Member of the Order of the British Empire (MBE) in the 1993 New Year's honours list, for his services to the fireworks industry, and he was presented with a plaque by the Royal Society of Chemistry in 2013.

His son Mark Lancaster has served as an explosives expert in the Royal Engineers, and was involved in running the fireworks business before he was elected as Conservative MP for Milton Keynes North East in 2005, re-elected for Milton Keynes North in 2010, 2015 and 2017. He Served as a Defence Minister between 2015-2019 before retiring from Parliament in 2019.  He was elevated to the House of Lords as Baron Lancaster of Kimbolton in Sept 2020.

References 

British chemists
Living people
Schoolteachers from Cambridgeshire
1931 births
Date of birth missing (living people)
Place of birth missing (living people)
Members of the Order of the British Empire
Alumni of St John's College, Durham
Fireworks
People from Kimbolton, Cambridgeshire